Seyu Khosavi Hashem (also Romanized as Seyū Khosavī Hāshem; also known as So’ūkhsū Hāshem and Soyūkhsū Hāshem) is a village in Gholaman Rural District, Raz and Jargalan District, Bojnord County, North Khorasan Province, Iran. At the 2006 census, its population was 1,359, in 286 families.

References 

Populated places in Bojnord County